Nyuni Island is a coral island in Songosongo ward in Kilwa District of Lindi Region in Tanzania's Indian ocean coast.   Geographically, the island is part of the Songosongo Islands archipelago which is composed of 22 reefs and 4 islands. The other three islands are Songo Songo , Fanjove Island and Okuza Island.  Nyuni island has an elevation of 14m.

References

 Islands of Lindi Region
 Islands of Tanzania